Augusto Temístocles da Silva Costa (February 10, 1926 – October 26, 1993)  known  artistically  as Tião Macalé, was a Brazilian comedian.

He was born in Rio de Janeiro.  He is known in Brazil for his role of supporting character in the Brazilian comedic series Os Trapalhões in the 1980s and early 1990s, and famous for his catchphrase Nojento! (Disgusting!) in the series and TV commercials. He suffered from lung diseases and died in São José do Rio Preto in 1993.

Filmography

With Os Trapalhões
 1990 - O Mistério de Robin Hood
 1983 - Atrapalhando a Suate (this film was produced with the absence of Didi [Renato Aragão], because Dedé, Mussum and Zacarias had left temporally the series and the group Os Trapalhões [which Aragão owned] at the time the movie was made)

Solo
 1990 - O Escorpião Escarlate
 1986 - As Sete Vampiras
 1983 - A Longa Noite do Prazer
 1978 - As 1001 Posições do Amor
 1975 - Com as Calças na Mão
 1975 - Com Um Grilo na Cama
 1975 - Costinha o Rei da Selva
 1975 - O Estranho Vicio do Dr. Cornélio
 1975 - O Padre Que Queria Pecar
 1974 - O Comprador de Fazendas
 1973 - Salve-se Quem Puder
 1973 - Café na Cama
 1971 - Os Caras de Pau
 1969 - O Impossível Acontece

External links

Sources

1926 births
1993 deaths
Afro-Brazilian people
Brazilian male comedians
Os Trapalhões
20th-century comedians